Move with You may refer to:

"Move with You", 2014 single by Jacob Banks (singer)
"Move with You", 2002 album track by Pork Tornado